George Waterhouse (4 February 1899 – 8 December 1931) was an Australian rules footballer who played with South Melbourne, Richmond and Fitzroy in the Victorian Football League (VFL)  as well as Geelong Association and Port Melbourne in the Victorian Football Association (VFA)

Waterhouse initially played for Horsham in 1922 before moving to Ballarat Imperial in 1923. He was selected to represent the Ballarat League team that played Broken Hill in June and shortly afterwards secured a permit to move to Geelong Association in the VFA. Waterhouse played with Geelong Association until Round 1 of the 1925 season, after which he transferred to South Melbourne where he had been training. He only managed two games with South and within two months had moved again, this time to Port Melbourne, his third senior club in the one season.

In 1926 Waterhouse moved to Richmond where he added seven more VFL games to his career total. In 1927 he played one further VFL game, this time with Fitzroy.

Notes

External links 
		

1899 births
1931 deaths
Australian rules footballers from Victoria (Australia)
Horsham Football Club players
Ballarat Imperial Football Club players
Sydney Swans players
Port Melbourne Football Club players
Richmond Football Club players
Fitzroy Football Club players